Ajdovščina railway station is the principal railway station in Ajdovščina, Slovenia.

References

External links 

Official site of the Slovenian railways  

Railway stations in Slovenia
Railway station